Fontainea picrosperma, commonly known as the blushwood tree, is a rainforest tree in the family Euphorbiaceae endemic to Queensland in Australia, where it grows on the Atherton Tablelands.

Uses
An anti-cancer drug known as EBC-46 has been developed from an extract of the fruits of Fontainea picrosperma. Trials have shown that it has activity against four different types of tumours, including basal-cell carcinoma, melanoma, squamous cell carcinoma and breast adenocarcinoma. The fruits are toxic to humans if eaten.

References

picrosperma
Trees of Australia
Malpighiales of Australia
Critically endangered flora of Australia
Flora of Queensland